Iron Gate Dam is an earthfill hydroelectric dam on the Klamath River in northern California, outside Hornbrook, California, opened in 1964. The dam blocks the Klamath River to create the Iron Gate Lake Reservoir. It is the lowermost of a series of power dams on the river, the Klamath River Hydroelectric Project, operated by PacifiCorp. It also poses the first barrier to migrating salmon in the Klamath. The Iron Gate Fish Hatchery was placed just after the dam, hatching salmon and steelhead that are released back into the river.
The Iron Gate Dam (National ID CN 001223) along with the John C. Boyle Dam are two of four on the Klamath River that would be removed under the Klamath Economic Restoration Act.  As of February 2016, the states of Oregon and California, the dam owners, federal regulators and other parties reached an agreement to remove all four dams by the year 2020, pending approval by the Federal Energy Regulatory Commission. As of February 25, 2022, the FERC released their final Environmental Impact Statement (EIS) on the dam's removal. The Iron Gate Dam is expected to be removed sometime in 2023 or 2024. A movement to Un-Dam the Klamath has been ongoing for 20 years to remove the dams.

Iron Gate Reservoir 
Iron Gate Reservoir is an artificial lake on the Klamath River in Siskiyou County, California, near the Oregon border of the United States. The lake's waters are impounded by the Iron Gate Dam, and operated by PacifiCorp. It has an average depth of 70 feet (21.4 m).

The Iron Gate Reservoir is host to several recreation activities. There are several campsites on the Western side of the reservoir. Some campsites such as Mirror Cove and Juniper Point are open from May to October. Others such as Camp Creek are open year round. All campsites are free to use. Each site has a launch point, allowing for boating, kayaking, and swimming on the reservoir. The reservoir contains yellow perch, trout, largemouth bass, catfish, and native rainbow trout, which makes it a popular fishing location.

In 2020, the state released a danger warning about harmful blue-green algae (cyanobacteria) blooms.  These blooms are toxic to humans and animals so announcements were made warning against swimming in the reservoir and eating of any fish from the reservoir. There have been reports in the past, but no warnings have been made since. These algal bloom growth likely occurred due to lower water levels and increasing water temperatures.

See also
Copco Lake
List of dams and reservoirs in California
Un-Dam the Klamath

References

Buildings and structures in Siskiyou County, California
Dams in California
PacifiCorp dams
Dams completed in 1964
Dams on the Klamath River
Earth-filled dams